Mjöhult is a locality situated in Höganäs Municipality, Skåne County, Sweden with 292 inhabitants in 2010.

References

External links
Mjöhult.just.nu (Swedish)

Populated places in Höganäs Municipality
Populated places in Skåne County